Bondage Goat Zombie is the seventh studio album by the Austrian extreme metal band Belphegor. Artwork by Ralph Manfreda. It is the first album to feature bassist Serpenth. 

Some of the tracks deal with the writings of the Marquis de Sade. The album was, like its predecessor, Pestapokalypse VI, recorded and produced with German producer Andy Classen. The album leaked onto P2P file sharing networks on 17 March 2008. Hecate provided lyrics on track 7.

Track listing

Personnel

"Bondage Goat Zombie"
"Bondage Goat Zombie" is the first single by Belphegor. It was released on 22 February 2008, by Nuclear Blast.

Track listing

Charts

Release history

References
 

Belphegor albums
2008 albums
Nuclear Blast albums
German-language albums
Albums produced by Andy Classen